Karim Essikal (born 8 February 1996) is a Moroccan footballer who plays for Belgian Division 2 club Oudenaarde.

Essikal was born in Belgium to parents of Moroccan descent. He debuted for the Morocco national under-17 football team in a 2013 FIFA U-17 World Cup 4–2 win against Panama U17.

References

External links
 
 

1993 births
Belgian sportspeople of Moroccan descent
Living people
Moroccan footballers
Belgian footballers
Association football defenders
S.V. Zulte Waregem players
Royal Excel Mouscron players
K Beerschot VA players
FC Eindhoven players
Hassania Agadir players
Belgian Pro League players
Challenger Pro League players
Eerste Divisie players
Botola players
Moroccan expatriate footballers
Expatriate footballers in the Netherlands
Moroccan expatriate sportspeople in the Netherlands
Footballers from Brussels